Kėdainiai District Municipality is one of 60 municipalities in Lithuania, located in the central part of the country.

Structure 
Kėdainiai District Municipality is divided into:   
 1 city: Kėdainiai;
 10 towns: Akademija, Kėdainiai, Dotnuva, Gudžiūnai, Josvainiai, Krakės, Pagiriai, Pernarava, Surviliškis, Šėta and Truskava;
 11 elderships:

 534 villages.

Population

Ethnic composition
Ethnic composition of Kėdainiai District Municipality according to the 2011 census:
 Lithuanians – 95.78% (51,777);
 Russians – 2.17% (1,171);
 Poles – 0.61% (329);
 Ukrainians – 0.28% (150);
 Belarusians – 0.26% (139);
 Romani – 0.07% (40);
 Germans – 0.03% (17);
 Others – 0.8% (434).

Largest settlements

References

 
Municipalities of Kaunas County
Municipalities of Lithuania